Pokhriabong (also spelt as Pokhribong or Pokhrabong) is a village in the Jorebunglow Sukhiapokri CD block in the Darjeeling Sadar subdivision of the Darjeeling district in West Bengal, India.

Geography

Location

Pokhriabong is located 29 kilometres from the town of Darjeeling on the Nagri spur which divides the waters of Balason River from its tributary Rangbhang. Pokhriabong Rangbhang valley as it known has a total of eight Tea Estate. Pokhriabong has a very hospitable environment with summer temperatures reaching up to 24℃ and winters with temperatures dropping down to -1℃/2℃. Pokhriabong has many villages within it and within the villages are many sub-villages and more. The region has a great production of tea fruits and vegetables. Pokhriabong valley has two main rivers. Flowing on the northeast is the River Balason and on the southwest is the mighty River Rangbhang. Pokhriabong also attracts a wide number of tourists as it is very natural and people here are very friendly.
Languages spoken here are Nepali, English, Bengali, Hindi, Rai, limbu, Lepcha, Tibetan

Area overview
The map alongside shows a part of the southern portion of the Darjeeling Himalayan hill region in the Darjeeling district. In the Darjeeling Sadar subdivision 61.00% of the total population lives in the rural areas and 39.00% of the population lives in the urban areas. In the Mirik subdivision 80.11% of the total population lives in the rural areas and 19.89% lives in the urban areas. There are 78 tea gardens/ estates (the figure varies slightly according to different sources), in the district, producing and largely exporting Darjeeling tea. It engages a large proportion of the population directly/ indirectly. Some tea gardens were identified in the 2011 census as census towns or villages. Such places are marked in the map as CT (census town) or R (rural/ urban centre). Specific tea estate pages are marked TE.

Note: The map alongside presents some of the notable locations in the subdivision. All places marked in the map are linked in the larger full screen map.

Demographics
According to the 2011 Census of India, Pokhriabong Khasmahal had a total population of 3,051 of which 1,511 (50%) were males and 1,540 (50%) were females. There were 252 persons in the age range of 0 to 6 years. The total number of literate people in Pokhriabong Khasmahal was 2,473 (81.06% of the population over 6 years).

Wildlife
This area has a small population of the endangered Chinese pangolin. For the avid bird watcher, there is a plethora of Himalayan bird life in the area, treepies, barbets, pheasants, flycatchers, sunbirds and orioles to name a few. Also different species of butterflies can be seen if one is lucky enough. There is also snakes wild boar black deer if lucky or unlucky one might get a chance to see a leopard.

References

Villages in Darjeeling district